Tarkeshwar Nath Temple (Hindi: ताडकेश्वर महादेव मंदिर) is a popular temple of the Lord Shiva in the Jaipur city in the state of Rajasthan, India. This temple is located on a green hill in the Choura Rasta, area of Jaipur. It is a popular temple of the Lord Shiva.

The temple is named after the tree Borassus which is called Taad in Hindi.

References

Hindu temples in Rajasthan
Hindu temples in Jaipur
Tourist attractions in Jaipur